The Fourteenth legislative assembly election was held on 13 April 2011 to elect members from 234 constituencies in Tamil Nadu. Results were released on 13 May 2011. Two major parties Dravida Munnetra Kazhagam (DMK) and All India Anna Dravida Munnetra Kazhagam (AIADMK) faced the election as coalitions of multiple parties with the DMK front consisting of 8 parties and the AIADMK of 11 parties. AIADMK front won the election, winning in 203 constituencies, with the AIADMK party itself winning 150 seats thus securing a simple majority to be able to form the government without the support of its coalition partners.

Cabinet ministers

Swearing-in
Jayalalitha submitted her unanimous election as the leader of ADMK legislature party to Governor Surjit Singh Barnala on 15 May 2011. She was sworn-in as Chief Minister along with 33 other ministers at the Madras University centenary auditorium on 16 May 2011 by the Governor, the same venue she took oath in 1991 when she first became chief minister. She and all other ministers took oath in Tamil. The ceremony was attended by then Gujarat Chief Minister Narendra Modi, former Andhra Pradesh Chief Minister N. Chandrababu Naidu and Communist Party of India (CPI) General Secretary A. B. Bardhan among others.

Achievements

Relocation of assembly building
In one of the first actions following her re-election as the Chief Minister of Tamil Nadu, Jayalaitha proceeded to relocate the assembly and secretariat from the newly constructed building back to Fort St. George. The assembly building was constructed during M. Karunanidhi's tenure and costed over 1000 crores of rupees. This move was opposed by Pattali Makkal Katchi, Marumalarchi Dravida Munnetra Kazhagam and Dravidar Kazhagam. A public interest litigation has been filed in Chennai high court by lawyer G. Krishnamoorthy alleging that the relocation was against public interest and unmindful of the large amount of tax money used for the construction of the new building.

Amma Unavagam

In February 2013, Jayalalithaa Government inaugurated the state-run Subsidised food programme called Amma Unavagam (Amma Canteen), which was later praised by economist and Nobel laureate Amartya Sen in his book An Uncertain Glory – India and its Contradictions and inspired by many states in India. The Scheme was also lauded by Egypt in 2014. Under the scheme, municipal corporations of the state-run canteens serving subsidised food at low prices.

Amma Branded Schemes
The plenty of populist schemes such as Amma Kudineer (bottled mineral water), 'Amma' Salt, 'Amma' Medical Shops, and 'Amma' Cement were also implemented.

In 2015, The Government launched 'Amma baby care kit' scheme where every mother who gave birth in the government hospital gets 16 types of products.

Tamizhaga arasu madikanini thittam
Tamizhaga arasu madikanini thittam is a scheme in Tamil Nadu to distribute free laptops to students of secondary schools and colleges. The scheme was implemented beginning in September 2011 to fulfill a campaign promise of Chief Minister Jayalalithaa of the AIADMK.

Other Achievements 

The Government also announced the Pension Scheme for Destitute Transgender by which those above ages of 40 could get a monthly pension of Rs.1,000. Jayalalithaa government ensured members of the transgender community could enrol for education and job. Beginning from 2011, every year Jayalalithaa government gave free laptops to students who clear tenth and twelfth standard to impart digital education to rural areas. The government in 2011 decided to give four goats and a cow to each family below poverty line — mixer and grinders and fans for households, 3 sets of free uniforms, school, bags, notebooks, geometry boxes for all children in government schools, and cycles and laptops for Class 11 and 12 students. In 2011 It launched the marriage assistance scheme wherein the female students received 4 gram gold free for use as Thirumangalyam for their marriage and cash assistance up to Rs.50,000 for undergraduate or diploma holding females. There were rampant power cut issues between 2006 and 2011 while AIADMK was in opposition wherein for 10 to 15 hours there was no supply of electricity. However, after Jayalalithaa regained power, between 2011 and 2015, The state government corrected all the discrepancies of previous DMK regime such that the Central Electricity Authority in 2016 said the state is expected to have 11,649 million units of surplus power. Tamil Nadu became among the power surplus states while Jayalalithaa was chief minister in this term. In the government ensured the wrongfully usurped property by land grabbing during 2006 to 2011 in the previous DMK regime, had been retrieved and handed over to rightful owners between 2011 and 2015.

Jayalalithaa Government announced in 2012, the Vision 2023 document which embodied a strategic plan for infrastructure development which included raising the per capita income of residents to $10,000 per annum, matching Human Development Index to that of developed countries by 2023, providing high-quality infrastructure all over the State, making Tamil Nadu the knowledge capital and innovation hub of India. This project had three components — Overall Vision Document, Compilation of Project Profile and Road Map. The work on this continued under her supervision until her death. She inaugurated 'Amma health insurance scheme' in 2012.

References

All India Anna Dravida Munnetra Kazhagam
2011 in Indian politics
Tamil Nadu ministries
2010s in Tamil Nadu
2011 establishments in Tamil Nadu
2014 disestablishments in India
Cabinets established in 2011
Cabinets disestablished in 2014